"Crackers" is a song written by Kye Fleming and Dennis Morgan, and recorded by American country music artist Barbara Mandrell.  It was released in June 1980 as the lead single from the album Love Is Fair.  It peaked at #3 on the U.S. Billboard Hot Country Singles chart and #6 on the Canadian RPM Country Tracks chart.

Content
The song describes a woman asking for her ex-lover, who left her after a series of arguments, to come back, as being lonely is too much for her to bear. She decides that the arguments were over things that were trivial, among them eating crackers in bed, and promises that he will be allowed to have his way on them if he comes back.

Charts

Weekly charts

Year-end charts

References

1980 singles
Barbara Mandrell songs
Songs written by Kye Fleming
Songs written by Dennis Morgan (songwriter)
Song recordings produced by Tom Collins (record producer)
MCA Records singles
1980 songs